Marius Probst (born 20 August 1995) is a German middle-distance runner specialising in the 1500 metres. He won a gold medal at the 2017 European U23 Championships. Additionally, he finished sixth at the 2019 European Indoor Championships.

International competitions

Personal bests
Outdoor
800 metres – 1:47.56 (Kortrijk 2018)
1000 metres – 2:22.77 (Dortmund 2015)
1500 metres – 3:37.07 (Oordegem 2018)
Indoor
800 metres – 1:47.33 (Erfurt 2018)
1500 metres – 3:39.89 (Karlsruhe 2019)

References

1995 births
Living people
People from Herne, North Rhine-Westphalia
Sportspeople from Arnsberg (region)
German male middle-distance runners
German national athletics champions
TV Wattenscheid athletes
21st-century German people
20th-century German people